Festus Oyetola Sobanke is the Anglican Bishop of Omu-Aran in Kwara Province  of the Church of Nigeria.

He was consecrated Bishop of Omu-Aran in April 2019 at St David's Anglican Cathedral Church, Ijomu, Akure, by the Primate of All Nigeria, Nicholas Okoh.

Sobanke is the second Bishop of Omu-Aran, succeeding the Pioneer Bishop Philip Adeyemo elected in 2007, who has retired.

References 

Anglican bishops of Omu-Aran
21st-century Anglican bishops in Nigeria
Nigerian Anglicans
Year of birth missing (living people)
Living people